Marie Myriam (born Myriam Lopes, 8 May 1957, Luluabourg, Belgian Congo, (now Democratic Republic of the Congo) is a French singer of Portuguese descent.

Career
Representing France, she won the Eurovision Song Contest in 1977 with L'oiseau et l'enfant  ("The bird and the child") the day before her 20th birthday, with music by Jean Paul Cara and words by Joe Gracy. The single reached No. 42 in the UK Singles Chart in June 1977.

In 1981, Myriam also represented France in the Yamaha Music Festival with the song "Sentimentale"; she came in ninth place. In recent years, she has read out the votes of the French Jury at the Eurovision Song Contest.

Myriam made an appearance at the 50th anniversary concert in Copenhagen, Denmark, in October 2005 as a guest presenter and performer. The same year, she wrote the introduction to the French edition of The Eurovision Song Contest – The Official History by John Kennedy O'Connor.

Personal life
Myriam was married to music producer Michel Elmosnino from the late 1970s until his death at age 67 on 20 December 2013. The marriage produced two children: Laureen, born 1982, now master of ceremony and Rick, born in 1990, assistant director and photographer .

Discography

References

External links

L'oiseau et l'enfant lyric with English translation
Bide et Musique entry

1957 births
Living people
People from Kananga
French people of Portuguese descent
French women singers
Eurovision Song Contest winners
Eurovision Song Contest entrants for France
Eurovision Song Contest entrants of 1977
French-language singers